Thai Jashe! is a 2016 Indian Gujarati film written and directed by Nirav Barot. It is about the struggles of a middle class man to achieve his goals in the metrocity Ahmedabad. The film stars Manoj Joshi, Malhar Thakar, and Monal Gajjar. The film was released on 3 June 2016.

Plot
Pranav Joshi (Malhar Thakar) works as an industrial designer in Ahmedabad. When his father's dyeing factory in Jetpur goes bankrupt, his parents are forced to move with him in Ahmedabad. When they are insulted by his land lady, Pranav decides he has had enough and decides to buy his own house in the city.

Pranav and his fiancée Kajal (Monal Gajjar) finalize a house, but the house owner backs out after the deal is finalized. Pranav resumes his search and finds a house, which is above his budget, but decides to buy it nonetheless. Pranav and Kajal decide to get married so they can avail higher loan as the joint applicants. Pranav manages rest of the amount from friends and his boss, but the bank refuses to approve the loan at the last moment because he works for a proprietary firm. Pranav delivers an impassioned speech and walks out of the bank. In the fortunate turn of events, because of a client work he had done, his firm secures an international client and now it's a private limited firm and Pranav is eligible for the loan again.

The film ends with Pranav, Kajal, and his parents moving into the new house.

Cast
 Malhar Thakar as Pranav Joshi
 Monal Gajjar as Kajal Bhatt
 Manoj Joshi as Chandrakantbhai Joshi
 Kumkum Das as Sarojben Joshi
 Hemang Dave as Deepak Dua
 Maulik Chauhan as Ram
 Sharad Vyas as Boss
 Bhavini Jani as Shanti Aunty
 Jay Bhatt as Pravinbhai
 Parth Raval as Himanshu Shah
 Viral Rachh as Govindbhai
 Atul Patel as Mr. Trivedi
 Subhash Brahmbhatt as Harkantbhai
 Dipti Brahmbhatt as Leelaben

Production

Development
The film was shot in Ahmedabad and Jetpur under the production of Kore Films LLP.

Casting
The theatre artist and Bollywood actor Manoj Joshi was roped in for the role of protagonist’s father. The role of protagonist is played by Malhar Thakar who last appeared in acclaimed film, Chhello Divas. The lead female role is played by Monal Gajjar.

Soundtrack

On the event of a music and poster launch of this movie, which was held in Cambey Hotel, Ahmedabad on 10 May 2016, the following soundtrack launched.

Release
The trailer of the film was released on 15 May 2016.
The film released on 3 June 2016 in 150 theatres and 350 screens across Gujarat and Maharashtra. The film's copy submitted for certification was leaked online and the makers filed a case with the cyber crime cell.

Reception

Box office
The film grossed  in the first four weeks.

Critical reception
Abhishek Jain praised the all facets of the film and recommended it. DeshGujarat praised the performances, but criticized the story line. BuddyBits rated it with 4/5 stars and said Thai Jashe is a must take ride into the life of a middle-class family.

Awards

16th Annual Transmedia Gujarati Screen & Stage awards

The film received nine nominations, including best film, best story and best director and won four awards.

 Best film
 Best Writer – Nirav Barot & Jay Bhatt
 Best actor – Malhar Thakar
 Best actress in supporting role – KumKum Das

2016 Gujarati Iconic Film Awards

The film received eleven nominations, including best film, best story and best director and won three awards.

 Story of the Year- Nirav Barot & Jay Bhatt
 Best Supporting Actor – Manoj Joshi
 Best Supporting Actress – Bhavini Jani

References

External links
 
Thai Jashe! on Facebook
 

2016 films
Films shot in India
Films set in Ahmedabad
Films shot in Ahmedabad
Films shot in Gujarat
2010s Gujarati-language films